Babakin may refer to:
Babakin, Western Australia
Georgy Babakin (1914–1971), Soviet space program engineer
Babakin (lunar crater)
Babakin Space Centre, a Lavochkin research center outside Moscow, Russia